Saia is an American less than truckload (LTL) trucking company, that originated in Houma, Louisiana in 1924. With original operation occurring in Louisiana and Texas for the first fifty years, expansion came after 1980 when coverage began reaching into more states within the South. Further expansion happened through mergers with other companies, which allowed Saia to provide service for thirty six states. Saia ranks within the top ten of LTL carriers in the United States, with revenues of over $1.8 billion in 2020.

History

Foundation and expansion
Saia began in 1924 in Houma, Louisiana by Louis Saia Sr. Louis was a produce dealer who realized that there was more success in delivering produce rather than selling it. The first Saia truck was his car with the rear seats removed.

By 1970, Saia expanded and established terminals in Texas and Louisiana. Saia became one of the largest regional LTL carriers in the United States with 23 terminals throughout the Southeastern United States and revenue exceeding $50 million.

Subsidiary of Preston and Yellow
The Saia family sold Saia to Preston Trucking in 1987.

The Yellow Corporation purchased Preston Trucking, along with subsidiaries Saia & Smalley, in 1993. In 1995 Saia merged with Smalley Transportation  resulting in the establishment of terminals in North Carolina, South Carolina and western Texas.

Resumed independence

In 2002 Saia and Delanco, New Jersey-based Jevic Transportation, another Yellow Corporation subsidiary, spun off to form an independent publicly traded company called SCS Transportation (SCS). Clark Brothers Transport, Inc. was acquired in 2004 incorporating its nine state, sixteen terminal operations into Saia.

In 2006, SCS sold Jevic to a Sun Capital Partners affiliate for $40 million. The sale came after years of low profitability at Jevic and allowed SCS to focus on its more successful Saia unit. Along with the sale, SCS announced plans to rebrand the parent company to Saia and move its corporate headquarters from Kansas City, Missouri to Saia's headquarters in Duluth, Georgia. Saia president Rick O'Dell would become president, CEO, and a board member of the parent company with former chairman and CEO, Bert Trucksess, transitioning to non-executive chairman. Jevic, originally founded in 1981 by Harry Mulschlegel, would shut down in 2008 after being unable to improve its fortunes as an independent company.

Saia began trading on the NASDAQ with the symbol SAIA.

Expansion via acquisitions
Saia expanded further with the acquisitions of two LTL carriers: Columbus, Ohio-based The Connection Company in 2006 and Madison Freight Systems (MFS) of Waunakee, Wisconsin in 2007.

Saia acquired Robart Transportation (and subsidiary The RL Services Group) in 2012 for approximately $7.8 million. Robart, founded in 1981 in Duluth, Georgia, was a non-asset truckload and brokerage service provider while The RL Services Group focused on supply chain, logistics, data mining, and operations analysis and related services. The acquisition of Robart, which Saia planned to rebrand under the Saia name, marked Saia's first significant move into non-asset logistics services.

In 2015, Saia acquired Dallas-based third-party logistics provider LinkEx for $25 million. LinkEx was founded in 2002 as a non-asset-based intermodal logistics management company, providing services and technology for management of international and domestic shipments. After the LinkEx purchase, Saia's previous non-asset acquisition, Robart, was merged into LinkEx which continued operations as a wholly-owned subsidiary of Saia with offices in Dallas, Atlanta, and Guadalajara, Mexico.

Operations
Saia has 192 terminals and serves the 48 states in the contiguous United States directly. It also serves Alaska, Hawaii, Puerto Rico, Mexico, and Canada via a network of partners. The three operating service groups of Saia are Saia LTL Freight, Saia Logistics Service, and LinkEx. Saia has over 10,500 employees and handles over 26,000 shipments per day as of 2021.

In 2017, Saia partnered with TST Overland Express, now TST-CF Express to provide cross border shipments into Canada. Saia provides the equivalent service for TST.

References

External links
Saia Official Website
LinkEx Official Website

Companies based in Fulton County, Georgia
1924 establishments in Georgia (U.S. state)
Trucking companies of the United States
Companies listed on the Nasdaq